Witch Hunter is a Korean manhwa series by CHO Jung-man. It has been serialized by Daewon in Young Champ since 2006 and as of May 2018, twenty one bound volumes were released. The series is licensed in North America by Seven Seas Entertainment (as Witch Buster) and released in omnibus format. The series is also licensed in France by Ki-Oon and Italy by Jpop.

Plot

In a world where witches have declared war against humanity, causing two-thirds of the world to fall apart, the surviving human population has gathered specialists with the power to hunt and destroy witches.
 
Tasha Godspell, also known as the "Magic Marksman," is one of the best Witch Hunters there is. Along with his sword-wielding Jack-o’-Lantern partner known as Halloween, Tasha puts his magical training and weaponry to good use, in his constant battles against witches. And yet, he cannot bring himself to fully hate the very witches he is tasked to destroy.

Terminology
Witches
Witches are the primary antagonists of the series. Witches were originally women or girls who have the potential to use magic and awaken, gaining a hat. Once they become witches, their personalities generally change, turning much more evil, although there are a few exceptions to this.

Supporters
Supporters are contracted partners/servants of witches who assists their master in battle and reduce the amount of mana needed for spells. Most Supporters are either magical creatures or items but humans can also become Supporters as well if they choose so. There are two classes of supporters; A Normal one and a Spiritual one. Spiritual supporters only die when their master dies and require nearly no mana. If a supporter is stronger than the witch, then they may break free from them. They also have a heart that receives mana that if destroyed, die as well.

Witch Hats
A witch's mana are stored in their hats and as such is a witch's most treasured possession. As magic in the hat runs out, the witch's original personality surfaces.

Mana
Mana is what allows witches and others to use magic. It's considered a poison to normal people, destroying their sanity and body except women.

References

Manhwa titles
2006 comics debuts
Seven Seas Entertainment titles
Action comics
Humor comics
Fantasy comics
Drama comics